The Zotye SR9 is a mid-size CUV produced by Zotye Auto for the Chinese market. The production car debuted in November 2016.  Pricing of the SR9 ranges from 109.800 to 162.800 yuan. Just like the previously launched SR7, the SR9 is also a controversial vehicle in terms of styling, because it heavily resembles the Porsche Macan. The mid-size Zotye SR9 is the second product of the Zotye S-series crossovers following the compact SR7.

Zotye SR9 HEV
The Zotye SR9 HEV is the plug-in hybrid electric vehicle (PHEV) version of the Zotye SR9. Debuted on the 2017 Chengdu Auto Show in August 2017, the hybrid combines the original 190hp 2.0 turbo with an electric motor with an electric-range of 80 kilometers.

Gallery

References

Notes

External links

 Official Website

Cars of China
SR9
Crossover sport utility vehicles
mid-size sport utility vehicles
Front-wheel-drive vehicles
Cars introduced in 2016